(plural Augustae) was a Roman imperial honorific title given to empresses and honoured women of the imperial families. It was the feminine form of Augustus. In the third century, Augustae could also receive the titles of Mater Senatus ("Mother of the Senate") and Mater Castrorum ("Mother of the Camp") and Mater Patriae ("Mother of the Fatherland").

The title implied the greatest prestige. Augustae could issue their own coinage, wear imperial regalia, and rule their own courts.

Wife of Claudius, Agrippina was the first wife of the emperor in Roman history to receive the throne of Augusta, a position she held for the rest of her life, ruling with her husband and son.

In the third century, Julia Domna was the first empress to receive the title combination "Pia Felix Augusta" after the death of her husband Septimius Severus, which may have implied greater powers being vested in her than what was usual for a Roman empress mother  and in this innumerable official position and honor, she accompanied his son on an extensive military campaign and provincial tour.

Principate period

Julio-Claudian dynasty

Flavian dynasty

Nerva–Antonine dynasty

Year of the Five Emperors

Severan dynasty

Crisis of the Third Century

Dominate period

Tetrarchy

Constantinian dynasty

Valentinianic dynasty

Theodosian dynasty

Leonid dynasty

Byzantine period

Justinian dynasty

Heraclian dynasty

Isaurian dynasty

Nikephorian dynasty

Amorian dynasty

Macedonian dynasty

Komnenid dynasty

Doukid dynasty

Komnenid dynasty

See also
List of Roman and Byzantine empresses
 Augustus (title)
List of Christian women of the patristic age

References

Citations

Sources

External links

Augustae
Augustae